Tamsui District Office is a light rail station of the Danhai light rail, which is operated by New Taipei Metro. It is located in Tamsui District, New Taipei, Taiwan.

Station overview
The station is an elevated station with two side platforms. It is located above Binhai Road Section 1 near its intersection with District Road 1 (Zhongshan North Road Section 2).

Station layout

Around the station
 Tamsui National Sports Center

References

2018 establishments in Taiwan
Railway stations opened in 2018
Danhai light rail stations